Bedlington Ironworks, in Blyth Dene, Northumberland, England, operated between 1736 and 1867.

Blyth Dene, near Bedlington, was an idyllic location next to the River Blyth which had all the right ingredients for an ironworks at the time: there were nodules of ironstone in the coal-laden banks of the river, there was plenty of wood for the traditional approach of charcoal making, water for driving the hammers, and the port of Blyth was only two miles downriver for shipping of the products. At the time, a Shropshire man, Abraham Darby had started a revolution in ironmaking by using coke instead of charcoal. The Bedlington ironworks originally consisted of two elements – a mill in Bebside and a furnace at Bedlington Mill

Bebside
By 1757, when it was sold again, there was a slitting mill which employed 40 nailers, a quay on the Bedlington side of the river and a "commodious dwelling house, fit for a gentleman's family consisting of ten fine rooms, four of which are hung with genteel papers, with good cellars, a stable, large garden and other conveniences". In 1782 (or 1792) the works, which by then were producing  of rod iron and iron hoops per year and exporting as far away as London. They introduced a rolling mill and the nailing business which had separated out steadily declined in importance.

Bedlington
The ancient corn mill at Bedlington was taken over in 1759 by Malings & Co of Sunderland, who built a blast furnace for foundry work. However, they did not do well. Later there was a forge driven by a huge water wheel and a puddling furnace which needed the coal that was all around.

The 19th century
By 1788, both works had passed to William Hawks and Thomas Longridge, brothers-in-law from Gateshead, who were both ironmasters. Though in 1809 the business passed to Gordon and Biddulph, by 1819 Michael Longridge, nephew of the previous co-owner was in charge. Longridge, influenced by a report from Robert Stevenson of Edinburgh, decided on malleable iron rails and his agent John Birkinshaw developed a number of wedge-formed shapes to reduce the amount of iron, taking out a patent in 1820, and the rails were made with a swell or curvature in the middle.

The  wagonway (which cost 15 shillings a yard or 16 shillings 4¾ pence a metre) was a great success and deeply impressed George Stephenson, a close friend of Longridge who went on to use Birkinshaw's invention in the Stockton and Darlington Railway and by 1822 the Bedlington Iron Company had delivered  of malleable iron rails to the venture. This level of production was far beyond that possible by the manual casting techniques used at the time and was an important factor in the success of the railways.

By 1836, the ambitious Longridge was also making locomotives for the railways, despite the opposition of Robert Stephenson, George Stephenson's son, and the first locomotive, the "Michael Longridge", was delivered in 1837 to the Stanhope and Tyne Railway.

Though the locomotive plant closed in 1855, the Bedlington works exported both rails and locomotives to many parts of Europe and played a significant part in the explosive growth of the railway system. The works were at their peak in 1850 producing rails and castings for the Crimean War effort.

Longridge sold the works in 1853 and from there on it declined rapidly and was closed in 1867. The same year, Daniel Gooch, Isambard Kingdom Brunel's locomotive engineer on the Great Western Railway, who was brought up in Bedlington and spent his childhood playing around the works, found some rails on the GWR that had come from Bedlington still in very good order after 37 years of use.

See also
 R. B. Longridge and Company

References
Chris Evans, 'Manufacturing iron in the northeast during the eighteenth century:  the case of Bedlington' Northern History 28 (1992), 178–196.  
C. Bergen, History of Bedlington ironworks (Bedlington c. 1940).
Bedlington Iron and Engine Works, 1736–1867
Painting of the Ironworks
Modern photo of the site

Buildings and structures in Northumberland
History of Northumberland
Industrial history of England
Ironworks and steelworks in England
History of rail transport in the United Kingdom
Railway lines in North East England
Rail transport in Northumberland